This is an incomplete list of mayors of the City of Niagara Falls, Ontario.

Town of (Clifton 1856-1880) Niagara Falls 1856-1904
 Gilbert McMicken (1856–1857)
 Frederic William Hill (1898)

City of Niagara Falls 1904-Present
 1. George Hanan (1904)
 2. W. H. Phemister (1905)
 3. R. P. Slater (1906-1907)
 4. Richard F. Carter (1908)
 3. R. P. Slater + (1909)
 5. O. E. Dores (1910-1911)
 6. Charles C. Cole (1912-1913)
 5. O. E. Dores + (1914)
 7. C. N. Glendening (1915-1917)
 8. Harry P. Stephens (1918-1921)
 9. Charles R. Newman (1922-1924)
 10. Harry P. Stephens (1925-1928)
 11. Charles Swayze (1929-1934)
 12. Charles W. Anderson (1935-1937)
 13. Carl Hanniwell (1938-1939)
 14. George R. Inglis (1940-1946)
 15. William Houck (1947 - 1950)
 16. Ernest Hawkins (1951-1958)
 17. Franklin Miller (1959-1964)
 18. Robert F. Keighan (1965-1966) 
 17. Franklin Miller +(1967-1972)
 19. George Bukator (1973 - 1978)
 20. Wayne Thomson (1978 - 1983)
 21. Bill Smeaton (1983 - 1991)
 20. Wayne Thomson +(1991 - 2003)
 22. Ted Salci (2003 - 2010)
 23. Jim Diodati (2010–present)

Note
+ Second time as mayor

References

http://www.niagarafalls.ca/living/heritage/default.aspx| History of Niagara Falls

Niagara Falls